The , also called the Cuban Bloodhound or Cuban Bullmastiff, is an extinct Cuban breed of domestic dog. It was of the dogo sub-type of the bullmastiff dog type, which as a general class was used for bull-baiting and dog fighting. The variety was introduced in Cuba to capture runaway slaves. After the abolition of slavery, they ceased to exist as a distinct population over time.

Appearance
They were between a bulldog and a mastiff in size. The muzzle was short, broad, and abruptly truncated. The head was broad and flat, and the lips were deeply pendulous. The medium-sized ears were also partly pendulous, the tail rather short, cylindrical, and turned upwards and forwards towards the tip. They were described as a "rusty wolf-colour", with black face, lips, and legs. They were notable for chasing slaves. It is not known when the dog was considered a specific breed, but by 1803 it is described thus by Robert Dallas: "The animal is the size of a very large hound, with ears erect, which are usually cropped at the points; the nose more pointed, but widening very much towards the after-part of the jaw. His coat, or skin, is much harder than that of most dogs, and so must be the whole structure of the body, as the severe beatings he undergoes in training would kill any other species of dog."

History

The Cuban mastiff developed from several breeds of bulldogs, mastiffs and cattle dogs, becoming an ideal fighter and property guardian. It is possible that some specimens of this breed were brought to America, where they were employed as watchdogs. They were also used as slave retrievers by the British during the Second Maroon War, by the French during the Saint-Domingue expedition, as well as the Americans in the Southern States. The British Governor of Jamaica, Alexander Lindsay, 6th Earl of Balcarres, sent emissaries to Havana in early 1795, to purchase 100 animals, after hearing of their successful use by the Spanish in chasing slaves and indigenous people in Cuba. Hundreds of hounds were supplied by Cuban breeders to the French during the Haitian revolt in 1803.

References

Extinct dog breeds
Dog fighting breeds
Mastiffs
Dog breeds originating in Cuba
Extinct animals of Cuba
Mammals of Cuba